Fadime Şahindal (2 April 1975, in Elbistan – 21 January 2002, in Uppsala) was a Kurdish immigrant who moved to Sweden from Turkey at the age of seven. She was murdered by her father, Rahmi, in January 2002 in an honour killing.

Life
Fadime Şahindal was a talented pupil but her parents hid her acceptance letter from the university. By chance she found out anyway she had been accepted for a course in social studies.

She was opposed to her family's insistence on arranging her marriage to a male cousin who lived in their Kurdish home village in Turkey. Instead she opted to pursue a relationship with a Swedish man. At first she kept the relationship secret, but her father found out about it. Şahindal then left her family and moved to Sundsvall, where her brother found her and threatened her. She went to the police, who advised her at first to talk to her family.  She then turned to the media with her story, after which she turned again to the police and was offered a secret identity. By turning to the media, Şahindal managed to receive support from the Swedish authorities. She filed a lawsuit against her father and brother, accusing them of unlawful threats, and won.

Şahindal was scheduled to move in with her boyfriend, Patrick, the following month, in June 1998, when he died in a car accident. He was buried in Uppsala. Her father forbade her to visit Uppsala, since he did not want her to visit her boyfriend's grave. Nalin Pekgul, a Kurdish-Swedish parliamentarian, negotiated a compromise in which Şahindal agreed to stay away from Uppsala and her father promised not to stalk her.

On 20 November 2001, the Violence Against Women network arranged a seminar on the topic "Integration on whose terms?". During the seminar, Şahindal spoke in front of the Riksdag about her personal story.

Murder 

On 21 January 2002, Şahindal secretly visited her mother and sisters in Uppsala. During the visit, her father arrived and shot her in the head in front of her mother and two sisters. Şahindal was buried in Uppsala.

Investigation and trial 
Confronted by police, Rahmi Şahindal confessed and said in his defence that he was ill. Despite the confession, one of her cousins later tried to convince the police that he had killed her. During the trial, her father said that another man killed Şahindal, but claimed that he could not reveal the killer's identity under threat of death.

Her father was ultimately convicted of murder by a Swedish court and sentenced to life imprisonment. He was released in 2018 after 16 years in prison. Her murder sparked a debate in Sweden about immigrant integration and raised questions regarding Patrick's death.

See also

 Honor-related violence in Sweden
 Pela Atroshi
 Banaz Mahmod
 Hatun Sürücü
 Murder of Ahmet Yıldız

Further reading
Akpinar, Aylin. "The honour/shame complex revisited: violence against women in the migration context." Women's Studies International Forum. Volume 26, Issue 5, September–October 2003, Pages 425–442. DOI: 10.1016/j.wsif.2003.08.001.
   Read an excerpt

References

Sources
Dietz, Mayanna. (February 5, 2002).  Kurd murder sparks ethnic debate.  CNN.com.  Retrieved on March 4, 2007.
Williams, Carol J.  (March 8, 2002).  'Honor killing' shakes up Sweden after man slays daughter who wouldn't wed.  Seattle Times.com.  Retrieved on March 4, 2007.

Fadime's speech to the Swedish parliament

External links 
Fadime's memorial page (Swedish)

2002 murders in Sweden
Burials at Uppsala old cemetery
Deaths by firearm in Sweden
Female murder victims
Filicides
Honor killing in Sweden
Honor killing victims
Swedish people of Kurdish descent
Swedish social democrats
Violence against women in Sweden